That Luzmela Girl (Spanish:La niña de Luzmela) is a novel by the Spanish writer Concha Espina, which was first published in 1909. In 1949, it was adapted into the film That Luzmela Girl directed by Ricardo Gascón.

References

Bibliography
 de España, Rafael. Directory of Spanish and Portuguese film-makers and films. Greenwood Press, 1994.

1909 novels
20th-century Spanish novels
Novels set in Spain
Spanish novels adapted into films